Andrews Glacier is an alpine glacier in a cirque below Otis Peak in Rocky Mountain National Park in the U.S. state of Colorado. When images of the glacier taken in the early 1900s are compared with those of the early 2000s, Andrews Glacier is showing a negative glacier mass balance which indicates the glacier is retreating.

See also
List of glaciers in the United States

References

Glaciers of Rocky Mountain National Park
Landforms of Larimer County, Colorado